The Democratic Alliance for the Fatherland (ADP), also known as simply L'Alliance, is a political party in Togo.

History
The ADP was formed as an opposition party in September 2005 by former Prime Minister Agbéyomé Kodjo and former National Assembly President Dahuku Péré. the President of the Alliance is vacant.

The Alliance participated in the October 2007 parliamentary elections, nominating 104 candidates (including substitutes) in 19 prefectures, as well as Lomé. However, it received just 0.7% of the vote and failed to win a seat in the National Assembly.

References

External links
Official website

Political parties in Togo
2005 establishments in Togo
Political parties established in 2005